Hedyotis lessertiana is a species of flowering plant in the coffee family, endemic to Sri Lanka.

References 

 https://www.gbif.org/species/109296081
 http://www.theplantlist.org/tpl1.1/record/kew-97392
 http://indiabiodiversity.org/species/show/265199

lessertiana
Endemic flora of Sri Lanka